Libeus "Libe" Washburn (June 16, 1874 – March 22, 1940) was an American professional baseball outfielder and pitcher. He had four hits in nine at-bats in six games.

Washburn was born in Lyme, New Hampshire and died in Malone, New York.

External links

1874 births
1940 deaths
New York Giants (NL) players
Philadelphia Phillies players
Baseball players from New Hampshire
People from Lyme, New Hampshire
Plattsburgh (baseball) players